Porters Pinnacles is a group of low ice-covered rocks forming a menace to navigation along the north coast of Thurston Island, located about 4 nautical miles (7 km) north of the east extremity of Glacier Bight. It was discovered by the U.S. Navy Bellingshausen Sea Expedition in February 1960, and named for Commander Philip W. Porter, Jr., U.S. Navy, commander of the icebreaker USS Glacier which made this discovery.

Maps
 Thurston Island – Jones Mountains. 1:500000 Antarctica Sketch Map. US Geological Survey, 1967.
 Antarctic Digital Database (ADD). Scale 1:250000 topographic map of Antarctica. Scientific Committee on Antarctic Research (SCAR). Since 1993, regularly upgraded and updated.

References

Reefs of Antarctica
Landforms of Ellsworth Land